San Juan, Puerto Rico, held an election for mayor on November 5, 1996. It was held as part of the 1996 Puerto Rican general election. It saw the election of Sila María Calderón, a member of the Popular Democratic Party.

Nominations

New Progressive Party primary
The New Progressive Party nominated speaker of the House of Representatives of Puerto Rico Zaida Cucusa Hernández in a primary held by the party on April 2, 1995. This marked the first time that the party had ever held a mayoral primary.

Out of roughly 30,000 votes cast, Calderon received roughly 90% of the vote in a landslide victory, defeating Jorge de Castro (former member of the Puerto Rican House of Representatives) and Nicolas Gautier.

Popular Democratic Party
The Popular Democratic Party  nominated former secretary of state of Puerto Rico Sila María Calderón.

Puerto Rican Independence Party
The Puerto Rican Independence Party nominated Irma Rodríguez

General election
This was the first mayoral election in the city's history in which the two leading candidates were both women.

Results

References

1996
San Juan, Puerto Rico mayoral
San Juan, Puerto Rico